Tull–Worth–Holland Farm is a historic farm and national historic district located near Kinston, Lenoir County, North Carolina. It encompasses 14 contributing buildings and 1 contributing site.  The district includes a significant cross section of domestic and agricultural buildings constructed between 1825 and 1942.  The farmhouse was built about 1825, and is a two-story, Federal style frame dwelling.  It has a gable roof, exterior end chimneys, and hall-and-parlor plan.  Other contributing resources are the Cook's House (c. 1890), privy / chicken house (c. 1850, c. 1930), Delco house (c. 1900), playhouse (c. 1925), barn (c. 1880), stable (c. 1870), cotton gin (c. 1880), five tobacco barns (c. 1900–1925), and a tenant house (c. 1875, c. 1900).

It was listed on the National Register of Historic Places in 1992.

References

Farms on the National Register of Historic Places in North Carolina
Historic districts on the National Register of Historic Places in North Carolina
Federal architecture in North Carolina
Buildings and structures in Lenoir County, North Carolina
National Register of Historic Places in Lenoir County, North Carolina